Mansa Devi Temple, Haridwar (Hindi: मंसा देवी मंदिर, हरिद्वार) is a Hindu temple dedicated to goddess Mansa Devi in the holy city of Haridwar in the Uttarakhand state of India. The temple is located atop the Bilwa Parvat on the Sivalik Hills, the southernmost mountain chain of the Himalayas. The temple, also known as Bilwa Tirth is one of the Panch Tirth (Five Pilgrimages) within Haridwar.

The temple is known for being the holy abode of Mansa Devi, a form of Shakti and is said to have emerged from the mind of the Lord Shiva. Mansa is regarded as the sister of the Nāga (serpent) Vasuki. She is also believed to be the daughter of Lord Shiva in his human incarnate. The term Mansa means wish and it is believed that the goddess fulfils all the wishes of a sincere devotee. There is a folk tale about this, once Mansa, a common girl who was unaware about her complete truth from her guardians decided to meet Lord Shiva and ask him about her truth. To meet Lord Shiva, she sat for Sadhana and after years of spiritual exercise, she got the fortune to meet Lord Shiva and clarify her truth from him. After learning her truth, she attained the powers of goddess of welfare for the world. Devotees who pray to Mansa Devi for fulfilling their wishes tie threads to the branches of a tree located in the temple. Once their wishes are fulfilled, people come back again to the temple to untie the thread from the tree. Goddess Mansa is also offered coconuts, fruits, garlands and incense sticks for prayer.

Mansa Devi Temple is a Siddh Peeth (These are known to fulfill the desires of the worshippers). It is one of three such Peeths located in Haridwar, the other two being Chandi Devi Temple and Maya Devi Temple. The inner shrine has two deities, one with eight arms and the other one with three heads and five arms.

The Temple

Mansa Devi Temple is considered as a must visit for the pilgrims going to Haridwar. It enhances the holy tradition of Haridwar which persists in the place from many past centuries. It offers views of the River Ganges and the plains of Haridwar. To reach the shrine one has to either follow the trekking route up to this holy shrine or ride on rope-way service. The rope-way service known as "Mansa Devi Udankhatola" was introduced for the benefit of the pilgrims and it is also used for transporting pilgrims to the nearly located Chandi Devi Temple. The rope-way carries the pilgrims from the lower station directly to the Mansa Devi Temple. On a normal day, the temple is open between 5 am and 9 pm, except for lunch closings of 12 pm to 2 pm.

It is said that Devi Mansa and Chandi, the two forms of goddess Parvati always reside close to each other. This belief can also be found true in other case since near to the Mata Mansa Devi Mandir in Panchkula, Haryana, there is a Chandi Mandir located nearby in Chandigarh.

Mansa Devi Temple is a popular temple of Goddess Mansa Devi located at Bilwa Parvat near Haridwar. Located  from Haridwar and is connected with a pedestrian path. Mansa Devi Mandir is open from 8:00 am to 5:00 pm.

Other Mansa Devi temples
Maa Mansa Devi Mandir, Bandha Bazar, Rajnandgaon, Chhattisgarh
 Mata Mansa Devi Mandir, Panchkula, Haryana
 Mansa Bari, Kolkata
 Mansa Devi Temple, Alwar, Rajasthan
 Mansa Devi Temple, Dhuri, Punjab
 Shri Mansa Mata Mandir Hasampur, Sikar, Rajasthan
 Mansa Devi Temple, Narela, Delhi
 Mansa Devi Temple, Sitamarhi, Bihar
 Maa Mansa Devi Mandir, Tomargarh (Khutailapatti), Mathura, Uttar Pradesh
 Maa Mansa Devi Mandir, Meerut, Uttar Pradesh
 Mansa Devi Temple, Mukkamala, West Godavari, Andhra Pradesh
 Mansa Devi Temple, Naidupeta, Andhra Pradesh
 Mansa Devi Temple, Tilaru, Andhra Pradesh
 Mansa Devi Temple, Dornipadu, Andhra Pradesh
 Mansa Devi Temple, Kanumalapalle, Andhra Pradesh
 Mansa Devi Temple, Chinadugam, Andhra Pradesh
 Mansa Devi Temple, Kurnool, Andhra Pradesh
 Mansa Devi Temple, Nellore, Andhra Pradesh
 Mansa Devi Temple, Thurpu Rompidodla, Nellore, Andhra Pradesh
 Mansa Devi Temple, Eluru, West Godavari, Andhra Pradesh
 Mansa Devi Temple, Behror in the Alwar district in the state of Rajasthan.

References

External links

Wikimapia - Mansa Devi Mandir, Haridwar
Religious Places in Haridwar district
Mansa Devi Temple, Haridwar
Mansa Devi Temple, Panchkula

Shakti temples
Hindu temples in Uttarakhand
Aerial tramways in India
Buildings and structures in Haridwar